Platycerium is a genus of about 18 fern species in the polypod family, Polypodiaceae. Ferns in this genus are widely known as staghorn or elkhorn ferns due to their uniquely shaped fronds. This genus is epiphytic and is native to tropical and temperate areas of South America, Africa, Southeast Asia, Australia, and New Guinea.

Description
Platycerium sporophytes (adult plants) have tufted roots,  growing from a short rhizome, and bear two types of fronds - basal and fertile fronds. Basal fronds are sterile, shield- or kidney-shaped, and laminate against the tree, to protect the fern's roots from damage and desiccation. In some Platycerium species, the top margin of these fronds will grow into an open crown of lobes; catching rainwater, falling forest litter, bird/animal droppings, and even the occasional fallen baby bird or deceased animal, these plants build up their own “compost” system of nutrition over many years.

Fertile fronds bear spores on their undersurface, are dichotomous or antler-shaped, and jut out or hang from the rhizome. The spores are born in sporangia, clustered in large sori that are usually positioned on the lobes, or at the sinus between frond lobes.

Some species of Platycerium are solitary, having only one rhizome. Other species form colonies when their rhizomes branch, or when new rhizomes are formed from root tips. If the conditions are right, the spores will germinate naturally, on surrounding trees. Platycerium gametophytes are a small, heart-shaped thallus.

Platycerium have diverged into four natural groups. Several Platycerium are strongly adapted to xeric conditions, with a  naturally drought-tolerant metabolism method having been reported for P. veitchii.

Species

Cultivation
The species Platycerium bifurcatum and Platycerium superbum are commonly cultivated as ornamental plants. These oddly shaped ferns grow on trees and rocks and can be found in gardens, especially tropical gardens.

Staghorns can be propagated by spores produced on the underside of the fertile fronds. Colonial Platycerium can also be vegetatively propagated by carefully dividing large healthy ones into smaller, separate plants. These new plants can then be attached to board mounts or be strapped to trees until they take to the tree themselves.

Gallery

References

 
Epiphytes
Pantropical flora
Garden plants of Asia
Garden plants of Africa
Garden plants of Australia
Garden plants of South America
Fern genera